The enzyme glycerophosphodiester phosphodiesterase ({EC 3.1.4.46) catalyzes the reaction 

a glycerophosphodiester + H2O  an alcohol + sn-glycerol 3-phosphate

This enzyme belongs to the family of hydrolases, specifically those acting on phosphoric diester bonds.  The systematic name is glycerophosphodiester glycerophosphohydrolase. Other names in common use include gene hpd protein, glycerophosphoryl diester phosphodiesterase, and IgD-binding protein D.  This enzyme participates in glycerophospholipid metabolism.

References

EC 3.1.4
Enzymes of known structure